Padmavyooham is a 1973 Indian Malayalam-language film, directed by J. Sasikumar and produced by C. C. Baby and V. M. Chandi. The film stars Prem Nazir, Vijayasree, Sukumari, Adoor Bhasi and Jose Prakash. The film has musical score by M. K. Arjunan.

Cast

Prem Nazir as Stephen
Vijayasree as Jaya, Rani (Double role)
Vincent as Sunny 
Sukumari as Maaya
Adoor Bhasi as Pathrose
Jose Prakash as Mathachan
Prema as Rosamma
Baby Sumathi as Leenamol
Bahadoor as Paulose 
Kottarakkara Sreedharan Nair as Ummachan
Meena as Anappara Kunjamma
Philomina as Raheal 
Sadhana as Chinnamma
N Govindankutty as Philip
Khadeeja  as Ealiyamma

Soundtrack
The music was composed by M. K. Arjunan, with lyrics written by Sreekumaran Thampi.

References

External links
 

1973 films
1970s Malayalam-language films
Films directed by J. Sasikumar